Euspira pallida is a species of predatory sea snail, a marine gastropod mollusk in the family Naticidae, the moon snails.

Description 
The maximum recorded shell length is 42 mm.

Distribution
This marine species occurs in European waters, the North Sea, the North Atlantic Ocean (from the Arctic Sea to North Carolina) and the Beaufort Sea

Habitat 
Minimum recorded depth is 0 m. Maximum recorded depth is 2480 m.

References

 Backeljau, T. (1986). Lijst van de recente mariene mollusken van België [List of the recent marine molluscs of Belgium]. Koninklijk Belgisch Instituut voor Natuurwetenschappen: Brussels, Belgium. 106 pp. 
 Turgeon, D.D., et al. 1998. Common and scientific names of aquatic invertebrates of the United States and Canada. American Fisheries Society Special Publication 26
 Gofas, S.; Le Renard, J.; Bouchet, P. (2001). Mollusca, in: Costello, M.J. et al. (Ed.) (2001). European register of marine species: a check-list of the marine species in Europe and a bibliography of guides to their identification. Collection Patrimoines Naturels, 50: pp. 180–213
 Turgeon, D.; Quinn, J.F.; Bogan, A.E.; Coan, E.V.; Hochberg, F.G.; Lyons, W.G.; Mikkelsen, P.M.; Neves, R.J.; Roper, C.F.E.; Rosenberg, G.; Roth, B.; Scheltema, A.; Thompson, F.G.; Vecchione, M.; Williams, J.D. (1998). Common and scientific names of aquatic invertebrates from the United States and Canada: mollusks. 2nd ed. American Fisheries Society Special Publication, 26. American Fisheries Society: Bethesda, MD (USA). . IX, 526 + cd-rom pp. page(s): 84
 Trott, T.J. 2004. Cobscook Bay inventory: a historical checklist of marine invertebrates spanning 162 years. Northeastern Naturalist (Special Issue 2): 261 - 324.
 Kantor, Y.I. & Sysoev, A.V. (eds), 2005. Catalogue of molluscs of Russia and adjacent countries. Moscow
 Kantor Yu.I. & Sysoev A.V. (2006) Marine and brackish water Gastropoda of Russia and adjacent countries: an illustrated catalogue. Moscow: KMK Scientific Press. 372 pp. + 140 pls
 Petit R.E. (2009) George Brettingham Sowerby, I, II & III: their conchological publications and molluscan taxa. Zootaxa 2189: 1–218
 Hasegawa K. (2009) Upper bathyal gastropods of the Pacific coast of northern Honshu, Japan, chiefly collected by R/V Wakataka-maru. In: T. Fujita (ed.), Deep-sea fauna and pollutants off Pacific coast of northern Japan. National Museum of Nature and Science Monographs 39: 225-383
 Torigoe K. & Inaba A. (2011) Revision on the classification of Recent Naticidae. Bulletin of the Nishinomiya Shell Museum 7: 133 + 15 pp., 4 pls.

External links

Naticidae
Gastropods described in 1829